Yves Béhar (born 1967) is a Swiss-born American designer, entrepreneur and educator. He is the founder and principal designer of Fuseproject, an industrial design and brand development firm. Béhar is also co-founder and Chief Creative Officer of August Smart Lock - a smart lock company acquired by Assa Abloy in 2017 - and co-founder of Canopy, a co-working space based in San Francisco.

In 2011, the Conde Nast Innovation and Design Awards recognized him as Designer of the Year. His clients have included Herman Miller, Movado, PUMA, Kodak, MINI, Western Digital, See Better to Learn Better, General Electric, Swarovski, Samsung, SNOO'S Happiest Baby Smart Bassinet, Jimmyjane, Prada and Cobalt Robotics.

Early Life and Career 

Béhar was born in 1967 in Lausanne, Switzerland to a German mother, Christine Béhar and a Sephardic Jewish, Turkish father, Henry Béhar.

He studied drawing and industrial design in both Europe and the United States. Béhar attended school in Lausanne, Switzerland and at the Art Center College of Design in Pasadena, California. In 1991, he received a Bachelor of Science in Industrial Design from the Art Center College of Design.

Prior to founding Fuseproject, Béhar was design leader at the Silicon Valley offices of frog design and Lunar Design, developing product identities for clients such as Apple, Hewlett-Packard and Silicon Graphics.

Work 
In 1999, Béhar founded the San Francisco and New York-based industrial design and brand management firm Fuseproject. At Fuseproject, Béhar oversees product design for a variety of industrial sectors, including fashion, lifestyle, sports and technology. His clients include Herman Miller, PUMA, One Laptop per Child, Jawbone, Kodak, Mission Motors, See Better to Learn Better, General Electric, Swarovski, Samsung, Jimmyjane, and Prada. In 2010, Fuseproject was the top winner of the Industrial Designers Society of America IDSA IDEA/Fast Company awards with 14 winning products.

He is the chief industrial designer of One Laptop per Child (OLPC's) XO laptop, signing on with the project in 2005 and has been with the team since March 2006. This collaboration has led to two additional laptop prototypes, the OLPC XOXO and OLPC XO-3.

From 2005–2012, he was chair of the Industrial Design Program at California College of the Arts.

Béhar's work has been featured in museums and exhibitions around the world, including at the Mudac, Design Miami, and in the permanent collection at MoMA, and SFMoMA, where Béhar is currently sitting on the Board of Trustees.

Design Ventures
Béhar was the Chief Creative Officer of the wearable technology company, Jawbone, from 2003 until 2017. In 2010, Béhar redesigned the Jawbone branding, packaging, communications and products. Behar designed the JAMBOX and BIG JAMBOX, a family of bluetooth compact audio speakers and also the UP: Jawbone's app-powered health and wellness wristband. Béhar collaborated with Ceft and Company New York for the Jawbone headset visuals. As of 2017, Jawbone was being liquidated and the money was being used for a new health start up called Jawbone Health.

He is the chief industrial designer of One Laptop per Child (OLPC's) XO laptop, signing on with the project in 2005 and has been with the team since March 2006. This collaboration has led to two additional laptop prototypes, the OLPC XOXO and OLPC XO-3.

In 2009, he collaborated with Ethan Imboden of Jimmyjane on a line of waterproof rechargeable vibrators. He partnered with Peel, a company that created an app and hardware to turn mobile devices into universal television remotes. Other investment and partner companies include Mint Cleaner, and Herman Miller.

In June 2012, Yves Behar and Ouya partnered to create an open, hackable game platform. The initiative launched on Kickstarter and raised over $8.5 million with over 63,000 backers.

In 2012 SodaStream International teamed with Béhar to introduce Source, a new home soda machine designed with a special emphasis on sustainability.

In June 2014, Béhar partnered with Mark One to announce Vessyl, a proposed intelligent drinking glass designed to help users make better decisions about their health and overall consumption. After taking in more than $11m in funding ($7m in institutional funding and $4m in preorders), the product never shipped.

In October 2015, Béhar and Movado announced a design collaboration, beginning with the Movado Edge; this is the first design partnership for the brand since the launch of their original Museum Dial watch in 1947.

Béhar launched the world's first smart bassinet with Dr. Harvey Karp in October 2016, utilizing robotic technology to simulate the 5 S technique detailed in Happiest Baby on the Block. In 2017, Behar introduced The Frame, a collaboration with Samsung; The Frame is a smart TV that, instead of going black when turned off, displays a piece of artwork from a world-renowned artist. The Frame now has an extended art collection with works from the Van Gogh Museum, Andy Warhol Museum, and the Prado.

In 2017, Béhar made international news by designing a model of security robots for use in workspaces which was launched by Cobalt Robotics..

Works

Béhar is a sustainability advocate who argues that a designer's role is to create products that are both commercially viable and contribute to social good.<ref>"Sustainability and notions of social good are the new values of the twenty-first century, and designers need to integrate them into every project they do, every relationship with industry that they have. We have a huge role to play in ensuring that these values are seen as assets; they must help create a product that is incredibly attractive, delightful, exciting, and commercially viable," from the foreword by Behar in: Blossom, Eve (2011)Material Change: Design Thinking and the Social Entrepreneurship Movement  p.6., Bellerophon Publications, Inc. </ref>

Béhar is a member of the Founder's Circle of the Cradle to Cradle Products Innovation Institute, a non-profit organization founded in 2010 in order to educate and empower manufacturers of consumer products to focus on environmental impact and social fairness.

He collaborates with clients to design and implement sustainable projects. As the chief industrial designer of One Laptop per Child (OLPC's) XO laptop, Béhar designed a series of low-cost, low-power laptops for distribution to low-income schoolchildren. The impact of OLPC on developing countries was so great that Uruguay purchased approximately 1,000,000 OLPC devices, and Rwanda has included an image of the OLPC XO notebook on their new currency. In 2008, Béhar redesigned the NYC Condom logo and packaging, as well as NYC Condom vending machines for the New York City Department of Health as a part of an initiative to reduce HIV/AIDS and teen pregnancy.

Béhar designed eyeglasses for the "Ver Bien para Aprender Mejor" (in English "See Better to Learn Better") program. "Ver Bien para Aprender Mejor" has provided free pairs of custom-designed eyeglasses to students throughout Mexico since 2010. In May 2011, Béhar partnered with Tipping Point, a San Francisco-based philanthropic organization, who made a pledge to the "See Well to Learn" program, which aims to distribute free pairs of glasses to San Francisco Bay Area students.

Additionally, Béhar is the only designer to have received two Index: Awards, with an additional nomination for his design of Puma's "Clever Little Bag."

Béhar is also the principal designer of the SPRING Accelerator programme created by the Nike Foundation, Girl Effect, USAID and DFID. The programme takes 18 entrepreneurs annually whose businesses provide products or services that directly impact the lives of adolescent girls living in poverty worldwide. The first cohort launched in June 2015, with entrepreneurs from Kenya, Uganda, and Rwanda. Yves Béhar and fuseproject provide hands-on design support for the businesses, including brand identity, product design, interactive design, and service/business modeling - working directly with adolescent girls in order to maximize impact and scalability.

 Personal life 
Béhar has four children; Sky (born 2007) from a prior relationship and Sylver (born 2010), Soleyl (born 2014), and Saylor (born 2016) with Sabrina Buell. His children all have the letter Y in their name to honor his father, Henry. Béhar married Sabrina Buell in September 2017 at Burning Man, at the wooden Aluna structure designed by Colombian architect Juan David Marulanda.

 Awards 

 2017 - Swiss Institute Honoree, Swiss Institute
 2015 - Design Visionary Award, Design Miami
 2014 - Béhar's company fuseproject listed among World's Top 10 Most Innovative Companies in Design by Fast Company,
 2012 -Béhar was featured on a February 26, 2012 episode of CNN's The Next List.
 2011- INDEX award for the OLPC XO laptop and the Verbien See Better to Learn Better, a collaboration with Augen Optics, eyeglass program 
 2011- Conde Nast Innovation and Design Awards, 2011: Yves Béhar - Designer of the Year, PUMA Clever Little Bag - Sustainability. 
 2011 - Treehugger's Best of Green Architecture and Design Awards – Herman Miller SAYL  and GE WattStation
 2010 - IDEA Awards 2010: ranked #1 winner with 14 awards in Fast Company
 2008 - Design Museum London "Design of the Year" award for One Laptop per Child (Brit Insurance 2008 Design Award)
 2007 - Béhar listed among TIME's "Top 25 Visionaries" 
 2007 - Fast Company 2007 Master of Design  
 2004 - National Design Award, category of Product Design from the Cooper-Hewitt, National Design Museum

 Exhibitions 

 Solo museum exhibitions 

2004 - The San Francisco Museum of Modern Art,
2004 - The Museum of Contemporary Design and Applied Arts (MUDAC) in Lausanne, Switzerland,

 Group museum exhibitions 

 2012 - Béhar's work, Alef of Life was exhibited at the Contemporary Jewish Museum in San Francisco, as part of the exhibit "Do Not Destroy: Trees, Art, and Jewish Thought: An Exhibition and The Dorothy Saxe Invitational".

References

 Surfing the Next Wave, Vanity Fair.
 All About Yves, Fast Company.
 Feature on Yves Behar, Wired Magazine''

External links
 Fuseproject Official website 
 Yves Béhar page on Fuseproject website
 Yves Béhar Twitter
 Material Change: Design Thinking and the Social Entrepreneurship Movement
 

1967 births
Living people
People from Lausanne
Swiss industrial designers
Swiss emigrants to the United States
Swiss people of German descent
Swiss people of Turkish-Jewish descent
Art Center College of Design alumni
People from San Francisco